The Consolidated Steel Corporation (formed 18 December 1928) was an American steel and shipbuilding business.  Consolidated built ships during World War II in two main locations: Wilmington, California and Orange, Texas. It was created in 1929 by the merger of Llewellyn Iron Works, Baker Iron Works and Union Iron Works,  all of Los Angeles. The company entered the shipbuilding business in 1939. In 1948, now a producer of large-diameter pipelines, Consolidated Steel was renamed Consolidated Western Steel and acquired by U.S. Steel and operated as a wholly-owned subsidiary. The San Diego-based Consolidated Aircraft Corp. is not related and neither is the Union Iron Works of San Francisco.

Orange shipyard 

Consolidated Steel bought the Orange Car and Steel Company property in May 1940 with the original intention of going into the business of barge and tug construction. During World War I, the land was occupied by the Southern Dry Dock & Shipbuilding Company, which operated 5 building ways for wooden hull construction for the United States Shipping Board, of which 6 were launched and at least one, Gonzalis (1918), was fitted with engines.

The modest facilities were expanded when Consolidated Steel was awarded destroyer contracts from the U.S. Navy in September 1940. After the war the site was sold to U.S. Steel together with Consolidated's assets in Los Angeles and whatever was obtained from the merger with Western Pipe and Steel elsewhere. The government-owned shipyard facilities were eventually bought by Consolidated Western Steel for $1,001,000 in the Summer of 1949, but not to be used for shipbuilding beyond the obligations imposed as part of the deal, to maintain this capability for some time. At its peak durning the war, it employed 20,000 people. The first ship launched was the destroyer  on March 2, 1942.  The last ship launched was the destroyer  on December 28, 1945. United States Naval Station Orange was the overseer of the Navy projects.

Contracts for 12 Fletchers were authorized with the Two-Ocean Navy Act and awarded later in 1940
Fletchers were produced no more than 6 concurrently. Gearings were produced no more than 10 concurrently. There were 6 slipways that could built one destroyer or destroyer escort and there were 2 side launching ways that could each build 2 destroyers or 3 destroyer escorts. The stern-first launching ways must obviously have been there first, see also launch photographs e.g. 

 39 of 415 destroyers
 12 of 175 s (built May 1941 - October 1942)
  ... 
 27 of 98 s  (built May 1944 - December 1945)
  ... 
  ... 
 102 of 563 destroyer escorts and APDs
 47 of 85 s (built June 1942 - December 1943)
  ... 
  ... 
 12 of 148 s (April 1943 - December 1943)
  ... 
 34 of 83 s (built October 1943 - August 1944)
  ... 
 6 of 6 s
 that were completed as APDs (instead of converted from finished DEs)
 3 of 50 s
 that were completed as APDs
 106 of 923 Landing Craft Infantry (built 1942-1944)
 Hull numbers 61 - 96, 943 - 1012

Levingston Shipbuilding Company and Weaver Shipyards round up the landscape of WW2 shipbuilding in Orange.

Wilmington shipyard 

The Consolidated Steel Wilmington shipyard in Wilmington, California was an emergency yard built in 1941 in the Port of Los Angeles West Basin after Consolidated Steel was awarded Maritime Commission contracts. At its peak, it employed 12,000 people, working on eight shipways on the 95-acre facility at 1100 W Harry Bridges Blvd, Wilmington. Production peaked on May 29, 1944, when it launched three large ships in only a -hour period.  The yard was built as a temporary facility and, like most such war plants, it was closed after the war ended.

Together, the shipyards ranked Consolidated 29th among United States corporations in the value of wartime production contracts.

Fifteen of the C1-B were built with steam turbines supplied by Joshua Hendy Iron Works ("JH") instead of those built by Westinghouse ("WH"). Hendy also provided the 36 triple expansion steam engines that went into the patrol frigates.

List of contracts:
 

Ships built:
 126 of 395 C1
 47 of 95 C1-B (14 of 61 in the assigned ranges below were built in the nearby Long Beach yard, in addition to the original 4)
  (MC-263) ...  (MC-266)
  (MC-486) ...  (MC-511)
  (MC-698) ...  (MC-701)
  (MC-1015) ...  (MC-1028)
  (MC-1042) ...  (MC-1044)
  (MC-1693) ...  (MC-1695)
  (MC-2073) ...  (MC-2079)
 complete list of the 47 C1-B built in Wilmington
 Comfort, launched 18 March 1943
 Mercy, launched 25 March 1943
  JH launched 27 January 1944 in Wilmington
  WH launched 11 March 1944
  WH 77th ship launched 7 March 1944
  JH launched 22 February 1944
  JH
  WH launched 13 January 1944
  WH launched 7 January 1944 (unpsec location)
  WH launched 23 December 1943
  JH 70th ship launched 11 December 1943
  WH launched 29 June 1943, likely Wilmington
  WH launched 18 June 1943
  WH, launched 29 May 1943
  WH
  JH
  JH
  JH
  WH 25th ship launched 16 February 1943 from slip No. 1
  WH, launched 16 April 1943
  WH, launched 5 April 1943
  WH launched 17 March 1943
  WH launched 3 March 1943; 27th C1
  WH 26th ship launched 20 February 1943 in Wilmington
  WH launched 3 February 1943
  WH 29th in CA, launched 24 January 1943
  WH 22nd C-1 launched 6 January 1943
  WH 21st C-1 launched 28 December 1942
  WH launched 18 October 1942
  WH 19th C-1 launched 11 October 1942
  WH14th ship launched 27 September 1942
  WH13th C-1 in W. launched 20 September 1942
  WH
  WH20th in W. launched 21 December 1942
  WH 19th ship (unspec location) launched 12 December 1942
  WH launched 27 November 1942
  WH
  WH10th C-1 in W. launched 20 August 1942
  WH 9th C-1 in W., built in 91 days, launched 10 August 1942
  WH launched 21 July 1942
  WH 7th ship launched 14 July 1942 for Lykes Brothers SS Line
  WH launched 2 July 1942
  WH 5th ship launched 20 June 1942 for Moore-McCormack Lines, keel laid 124 days ago
  WH 4th ship launched 8 June 1942
  WH - launched 1 June 42
  WH - launched 22 May 42
  WH - first ship launched at the yard on 11 May 1942 for Moore-McCormack Lines

 13 of 13 C1-S-AY1
  (MC-1029) ...  (MC-1041)
 all names in the form of "Cape X", all went to britain as "Empire X"
 SS Cape Girardeau 64th C-1 launched 7 November 1943
 SS Cape Compass launched 24 July 1943
 55 of 211 C1-M-AV1
  (MC-2314) ...  (MC-2331)
  (MC-2461) ...  (MC-2473)
  (MC-2563) ...  (MC-2586)
 18 of 96 Tacoma-class frigates  (S2-S1-AQ1) in 1943

 32 of 32 Gilliam-class attack transport (S4-SE2-BD1) in 1944 and 1945

 10 of 121 C2-S-B1

Bethlehem San Pedro and California Shipbuilding were located nearby on Terminal Island.

See also: California during World War II#Ship building

Long Beach shipyard

The former Long Beach Shipbuilding Company yard was the first Consolidated Steel facility to become operational. It was located at the entrance of Channel No. 3 on the south side.

On Liberty Fleet Day, September 27, 1941, the yard launched SS Alcoa Polaris, a C1-B type cargo vessel, as one of the fourteen ships launched nationwide on the same day to show the magnitude of the shipbuilding program.

 18 of 95 C1-B
  (MC-75), launched as Cape Mendocino 14 November 1940
  (MC-76), launched 27 April 1941(or 27 March)
  (MC-77), launched 26 June 1941
  (MC-78), laid down 7 April 1941, launched 27 September 1941
 ...the two P1 hulls were built during 1942...
  WH 30th ship (23 in W) launched 31 January 1943
  JH 6th C-1 launched 20 April 1943, Wilmington has launched 32 C1-B.
  JH, launched 29 May 1943
  WH launched 22 July 1943
 Hope launched 30 August 1943
  WH launched 22 October 1943, 12th ship launched at the yard
  WH launched 11 December 1943
 Cape Martin 88th total launched 24 January 1944
  JH 15th ship launched 2 March 1944
  JH 16th ship launched on 9 April 1944
  JH launched 10 May 1944
  JH launched 15 June 1944
  JH 19th ship, 106th W+LB, launched 10 July 1944 (Cape Edmont)
  JH

 Two type p1 passenger ships, model P1-S2-L2. The P1-S2-L2 s were two ships. The first American assault military transports. Made with an aft ramp for the launching of small landing craft or for the unloading of tanks.
 , first in class
 

 several C1-M
 , launched 28 september 1944
  launched 18 December 1944
  launched 30 December 1944
  launched 13 January 1945
  launched 27 January 1945
 several C1-M probable (WIlmington occupied)
 , launched 12 October 1944

Maywood plant

On 26 June 1927 Union Iron Works formally opened the first unit of a new multi-million dollar plant on their 25-acre tract at Stauson and Garfield avenues.

26 July 1930, Consolidated Steel purchased 50 acre at NE corner of Eastern and Stauson avenues.

The Union, Baker and Llewellyn Iron Works were competitors prior to consolidation in the markets of steel fabrication and erection in the Los Angeles area.

During World War II Landing craft mechanized were constructed to completion in the plant and their motors and hull integrity tested on site in a large water tank.

After the war

Shortly after the end of the war, in September 1945, Consolidated Steel bought the assets of the Western Pipe and Steel Company of California, another wartime shipbuilding firm, for $6,217,373.

In October 1946 a shipyard on Manicani Island off the coast of Samar in the Philippines came under the control of Consolidated and Bechtel interests under the name of Philippine Consolidated Shipyards. Initial contracts from the U.S. Navy for conversion, repair and construction of small craft,  which was completed in August 1947 after which Philippine Consolidated carried on with similar work in Manila and Cavite.

In September 1946 production was to commence on 214 miles and 60,000 tons of 30-inch pipe for the Southern California Gas Company for a contract value of $6m. This 214 mile section between Blythe and Santa Fe Springs was the western section of the first of the El Paso Natural Gas Company's pipelines supplying California from oil fields in Texas. Steel plates were provided by the Geneva Steel mill. The pipeline became operational on 13 November 1947. The source material for the process was 30 feet long, 92 inch wide plates, the welded pipe segments were hydraulically expanded in a closed die, yielding very straight pipe of improved strength. The capacity of the plant in 1947 was 9 miles of pipe per week. Shipped pipes were 60 feet in length, 2 sections welded together at the factory.

In early 1947 Consolidated was contracted to provide 980 miles of pipe for the Bechtel-built Trans-Arabian Pipeline, the National Tube Company of Pittsburgh (a U.S. Steel subsidiary) was to supply another 70 miles.

Going into the legal proceedings surrounding the planned acquisition by the Columbia Steel Company (a U.S. Steel subsidiary), at the beginning of the year 1947 Consolidated Steel owned and operated plants in Los Angeles, Vernon, Fresno, Berkeley and Taft in California, and in Phoenix, Arizona and Orange, Texas.

The company name was changed to Consolidated Western Steel Corp. on 1 July 1948. A separate company with the same name was incorporated in Delaware on 31 August 1948, on the date of purchase by Columbia.

The WPS assets along with some other assets of Consolidated were eventually sold in 1948 for over $17 million to Columbia Steel. The former President and Chairman of Consolidated Steel's board, Alden G. Roach, became President of Consolidated Western and of Columbia. Consolidated Western was later merged directly into the parent company, US Steel.

After the sale to Columbia, the remaining assets of Consolidated Steel were folded into a new company known as Consolidated Liquidating Corporation, which was dissolved on February 29, 1952.

In January 1949 CWS began fabrication of 1840 miles of pipe for the Transcontinental Gas Pipe Line Company's Texas-New York pipeline. (FPC Docket No. G-704, certificate issued 29 May 1948)

Also In January, Consolidated is contracted to built a new blast furnace at the Kaiser Fontana steel mill.

June 1949, contracts are awarded for Pacific Gas and Electric's 34-inch "Super-Inch" Pipe Line from Topock to San Francisco.

September 1949, Consolidated is applying for a certificate to operate in Pennsylvania to assist in the construction of a new welded pipe mill in McKeesport.

October 1949, construction is planned of a new pipe mill in Houston near the ship channel with a projected capacity of 50 miles of large diameter pipe per month. The project is cancelled, the mill is instead built in Orange, Texas. A general purpose plate shop and a 85x900 feet pipe mill became operational in March 1950. Also during that time the Orange plant was fabricating the large 34 feet, 10 inches diameter pipe sections for the Baytown Tunnel that crossed the Houston ship channel..

September 1950, construction to begin on 30-inch pipe for the Kirkuk–Baniyas oil pipeline.

August 1952, fabrication of parts of a 953 mile 24-inch crude oil pipeline from Wink, Texas to Norwalk, California to begin in a few months.

Consolidated was contracted for 20 miles of 30-inch pipe for an expansion of the California portion of the Texas Pipeline in November 1952, the project expected to be finished in March 1953.

Baker Iron Works 

The Baker Iron Works had its start at Los Angeles, California, about 1874, when Milo Stannard Baker (1828-1894) acquired a small machine shop there. The business, begun on a small scale as M.S. Baker & Company, grew quite rapidly.

A much larger facility was erected in 1886 and in June of that year the business was incorporated as the Baker Iron Works with capital stock of $75,000. Five Directors were named: Milo S. Baker, E.H. Booth, Charles F. Kimball, Fred L. Baker (Milo's son), and H.T. Neuree.

Less than a year later, Baker erected a $15,000 building [equivalent to $300,000 in today's buying power] on Buena Vista Street near College.

Baker Iron Works had a great many different products, manufacturing mining, milling, pumping, hoisting, oil and well drilling machinery, streetcars, boilers, oven and heating furnaces, as well as a line of architectural iron. It seems to have been especially noteworthy for steam boiler fabrication, installation and maintenance.

According to one authority, in 1889 Baker produced the first locomotive built in Los Angeles, designed by Milo's son Fred, vice president of the firm.

Another authority {106} says Baker built horse cars and perhaps street cars for Los Angeles, Pasadena and other communities in the Los Angeles area and that they built some larger cars for the Santa Ana & Orange Motor Road in 1898. According to this authority, after Pacific Electric bought this line, the cars were revamped and continued in service until 1920. It is claimed that in the early 1890s, Street Railway Journal reportedly ranked Baker "among the principal car builders on the Pacific Coast."

In 1887, Baker constructed six street cars for the City & Central Street Railway. {107}

A large variety of manufacturing was being done. The foundry was making iron and brass castings to fit nearly all kinds of machinery for mining and milling purposes, besides pumping plants for large and small waterworks, and steam plants for all the variety of uses to which steam was put. They manufactured their own boilers. They were also manufacturing oil-boring tools and rigs, and constructing elevators—both passenger and freight—in all varieties: hydraulic steam or hand. It was claimed by the newspaper that Baker had installed nearly all the first class passenger elevators in Southern California. The article said they manufacture street-cars and did other railroad work to order and claimed to make the best gang plows and road and field rollers that could be obtained anywhere. They also installed heating and ventilating plants for public buildings, both steam, hot water and hot air. And they did architectural iron-work. Milo S. Baker was then President, J.E. Sills was Vice-President and Treasurer, and Fred L. Baker (Milo's son) was Secretary and Plant Superintendent.

In 1891, Baker was awarded the contract to build the Santa Ana Water Works.

After the turn of the 20th century, Baker seems to have specialized in steel fabrication and elevator building.  Fred L.Baker headed the company as president after his father's death. Over the next 30 years they did the steel work and/or elevators for—among many others— Los Angeles' first skyscraper, the twelve-story Union Trust Building, the Public Service Building, the Queen of Angels Hospital, the YWCA Hotel, the United Artists-California Petroleum Building, the University of California at Westwood, The Masonic Temple at Glendale, the Los Angeles-First National Bank at Glendale, the Los Angeles-First National Bank at Hollywood and the University of Redlands at Redlands.

Erection of the Hotel Alexandria from prefabricated materials.

Fred L. Baker acted as president of the Los Angeles Shipbuilding and Dry Dock Company. The keels for the first 3 ships hastily laid down in the yard in July 1917 were fabricated in the Baker Iron Works shops.

Baker had a machine shop on North Broadway near Castelar street.

See also
California during World War II
Maritime history of California

External links
youtube.com, World War II Shipyards: Orange, Texas
youtube.com, Launch of Cape Mendocino (the last few seconds look like they might be in Tezas)
youtube.com, Oil Across Arabia (at 11:00)

Footnotes

References

Wilmington, California shipbuilding record

Defunct shipbuilding companies of the United States
Defense companies of the United States
Shipyards building World War II warships